Raghvendra Pratap Singh is an Indian politician, currently a member of Bharatiya Janata Party and six time Member Of Legislative Assembly from Barhara. He is the son of Ambika Sharan Singh, who was a noted freedom fighter, former Bihar state minister and five time MLA from Barhara. Raghvendra Pratap Singh has also been Bihar state minister twice earlier.

He claimed to have ensured huge participation from Barhara in the recently organized Veer Kunwar Singh Vijayotsav in Jagdishpur.

References 

Living people
1952 births
Bihar MLAs 2020–2025
Bihar MLAs 1985–1990
Bihar MLAs 1990–1995
Bihar MLAs 1995–2000
Bihar MLAs 2000–2005
Bihar MLAs 2010–2015
Bharatiya Janata Party politicians from Bihar